Allt-na-h-Airbhe (Scottish Gaelic: Allt na h-Airbhe), "stream at the boundary wall", is a small crofting settlement close to Ullapool, Ross and Cromarty, on the west shore of Loch Broom, and is within the council of Highland, Scotland.

References

See also
 Morefield
 Stornoway (by ferry)
 Ullapool bolide impact

Populated places in Ross and Cromarty